James Ramsay may refer to:
 Sir James Ramsay (1589–1638), Scottish soldier
 James Ramsay (bishop) (c. 1624–1696), Bishop of Ross
 James Ramsay (abolitionist) (1733–1789), Anglican minister and abolitionist
 James Ramsay (painter) (1789–1854), English portrait painter
 Sir James Ramsay, 8th Baronet (1797–1859), Scottish baronet
 James Graham Ramsay (1823–1903), North Carolina politician
 James Garden Ramsay (1827–1890), politician in colonial South Australia
 James Ramsay (Canadian politician) (1866–1935), merchant and politician in British Columbia, Canada
 James Ramsay (governor) (1916–1986), Governor of Queensland
 James Ramsay (1923–1996), co-founder of the James and Diana Ramsay Foundation in South Australia
 Jim Ramsay (1930–2013), Australian politician
 James Ramsay, 17th Earl of Dalhousie (born 1948), British land-owner

See also
 James Broun-Ramsay, 1st Marquess of Dalhousie (1812–1860), British colonial leader
 James Ramsey (disambiguation)